The Rolling Years is the first novel by the American writer Agnes Sligh Turnbull (1888–1982) and it is set in Westmoreland County, Pennsylvania, just east of Pittsburgh.

It is a family chronicle (1852–1910) of three generations of Scottish-American Presbyterians in rural Western Pennsylvania and their struggles to maintain their strict faith. The first generation is Daniel and Sarah McDowell, a farm couple. Sarah bears 12 children (of whom five survive) to her dour Calvinistic husband; her bitterness about her repeated, difficult confinements is effectively shown. The second generation is about their children, David and Jeannie. David moves to Pittsburgh where he becomes a judge. Jeannie marries a minister who has been serving as the local school teacher to earn money to complete his education. Jeannie's daughter, Constance, represents the third generation. She becomes a school teacher and struggles to find her place in a changing world. The novel dramatizes the gradual weakening of the strict Calvinism of the Scottish immigrants in an increasingly secular society.

References

1936 American novels
Novels set in Pennsylvania
Family saga novels
Westmoreland County, Pennsylvania
1936 debut novels